Shane Warne Foundation was an Australian not-for-profit organisation founded in 2004 by former cricketer Shane Warne. The organisation closed in 2017 following a regulatory investigation and controversy over its finances.

History
Warne founded the charity in 2003, with the intention of assisting "seriously ill and underprivileged children and teenagers". Dermott Brereton appeared on The Celebrity Apprentice Australia (season 3) in 2013 and raised $294,687 for the charity. During 2015, Barry Hall appeared on I'm a Celebrity...Get Me Out of Here!  and was runner-up, with his charity being the Shane Warne Foundation

People
Past members of the Board
Lydia Schiavello
Glenn Robbins
Andrew Bassat
John Ilhan
James Packer
Lloyd Williams
Garry Lyon
Ray Martin
Eddie McGuire
The charity also had a number of patrons and ambassadors including Fifi Box, Dermott Brereton, Michael Clarke, Nick Riewoldt, Liz Hurley, Russell Crowe and Karl Stefanovic

Difficulties and closure
Consumer Affairs Victoria commenced an investigation in 2015 into the Foundation after it failed to submit financial returns. Financial returns in 2014 had revealed the charity spent $281,434 on fundraising during the year, but its efforts only raised $279,198. Newspapers alleged that the organisation was only donating 16 cents in the dollar of its income.
During one year, the Chief Executive of the Foundation, Shane Warne's brother Jason, was paid a salary of $80,000 whilst only $54,600 was distributed to beneficiaries. The organisation spent more than $300,000 on catering, alcohol and prizes for events while posting significant annual losses.

In January 2016, in response to what it termed "unwarranted speculation", the Foundation announced its intention to distribute its final funds on 18 March 2016 and close down.

References

Shane Warne
2003 establishments in Australia
2017 disestablishments in Australia
Children's charities based in Australia
Foundations based in Australia
Organizations established in 2003
Organizations disestablished in 2017